John Perry (ca. 1639 – 29 March 1732) was an English merchant and politician who sat in the House of Commons between 1690 and 1705.

Perry was a London merchant who had interests in the East India Company and the Royal African Company.

Perry was elected Member of Parliament (MP) for New Shoreham in 1690 and held the seat until 1701 when he was defeated.  He stood unsuccessfully in a second election in 1701 and was returned again for New Shoreham in 1702. He held the seat until 1705 when he was again defeated.

Perry died 29 March 1732.

References

1630s births
1732 deaths
Year of birth uncertain
English merchants
People from Shoreham-by-Sea
18th-century English people
British East India Company people
English MPs 1690–1695
English MPs 1695–1698
English MPs 1698–1700
English MPs 1702–1705
Masters of the Worshipful Company of Brewers